Mystery Stone may refer to:

The Bourne Stone in Massachusetts
Grave Creek Stone of Moundsville, West Virginia
The Heavener, Poteau, and Shawnee runestones of Oklahoma.
The Ica stones of South America
Kensington Runestone of Kensington, Minnesota
Los Lunas Decalogue Stone of Los Lunas, New Mexico
Lake Winnipesaukee mystery stone of New Hampshire
Runestone of Nomans Land, Massachusetts
Stone spheres of Costa Rica